Suicide risk assessment is a process of estimating the likelihood for a person to attempt or die by suicide.  The goal of a thorough risk assessment is to learn about the circumstances of an individual person with regard to suicide, including warning signs, risk factors, and protective factors.  Risk for suicide is re-evaluated throughout the course of care to assess the patient's response to personal situational changes and clinical interventions. Accurate and defensible risk assessment requires a clinician to integrate a clinical judgment with the latest evidence-based practice, although accurate prediction of low base rate events, such as suicide, is inherently difficult and prone to false positives.

The assessment process is ethically complex: the concept of "imminent suicide" (implying the foreseeability of an inherently unpredictable act) is a legal construct in a clinical guise, which can be used to justify the rationing of emergency psychiatric resources or intrusion into patients' civil liberties.  Some experts recommend abandoning suicide risk assessment as it is so inaccurate. In addition suicide risk assessment is often conflated with assessment of self-harm which has little overlap with suicide. Instead, it is suggested that the emotional state which has caused the suicidal thoughts, feelings or behaviour should be the focus of assessment with a view to helping the patient rather than reducing the anxiety of clinician who overestimates the risk of suicide and are fearful of litigation. Given the difficulty of suicide prediction, researchers have attempted to improve the state of the art in both suicide and suicidal behavior prediction using natural language processing and machine learning applied to electronic health records.

In practice
There are risks and disadvantages to both over-estimation and under-estimation of suicide risk. Over-sensitivity to risk can have undesirable consequences, including inappropriate deprivation of patients' rights and squandering of scarce clinical resources. On the other hand, underestimating suicidality as a result of a dismissive attitude or lack of clinical skill jeopardizes patient safety and risks clinician liability. Some people may worry that asking about suicidal intentions will make suicide more likely. In reality, regarding that the enquiries are made sympathetically, it does not. Key areas to be assessed include the person's predisposition to suicidal behavior; identifiable precipitant or stressors such as job loss, recent death of a loved one and change of residence; the patient's symptomatic presentation; presence of hopelessness; nature of suicidal thinking; previous suicidal behavior; impulsivity and self-control; and protective factors.

Suicide risk assessment should distinguish between acute and chronic risk. Acute risk might be raised because of recent changes in the person's circumstances or mental state, while chronic risk is determined by a diagnosis of a mental illness, and social and demographic factors. Bryan and Rudd (2006) suggest a model in which risk is categorized into one of four categories: Baseline, Acute, Chronic high risk, and Chronic high risk with acute exacerbation. Risk level can be described semantically (in words) e.g. as Nonexistent, Mild, Moderate, Severe, or Extreme, and the clinical response can be determined accordingly. Others urge use of numbers to describe level of relative or (preferably) absolute risk of suicide.

SSI/MSSI

The Scale for Suicide Ideation (SSI) was developed in 1979 by Aaron T. Beck, Maria Kovacs, and Arlene Weissman to quantify intensity in suicide ideators. It was developed for use by clinicians during semi-structured interviews. The scale contained 19 items rated on a scale from 0 to 2, allowing scores between 0 and 38. The items could be grouped into three categories: "Active Suicidal Desire, Preparation, and Passive Suicidal Desire." Initial findings showed promising reliability and validity.

The Modified Scale for Suicide Ideation (MSSI) was developed by Miller et al., using 13 items from the SSI and 5 new items. The modifications increased both reliability and validity. The scale was also changed to range from 0 to 3, yielding a total score ranging from 0 to 54. Joiner found two factors, Suicidal Desire and Ideation, and Resolved Plans and Preparation. The MSSI was also shown to have higher discrimination between groups of suicide ideators and attempters than the BDI, BHS, PSI, and SPS.

SIS

The Suicide Intent Scale (SIS) was developed in order to assess the severity of suicide attempts. The scale consists of 15 questions which are scaled from 0–2, which take into account both the logistics of the suicide attempt as well as the intent. The scale has high reliability and validity. Suicide ranked higher in the severity of the logistics than attempted suicides (it was impossible to measure intent for suicide), and those with multiple attempts had higher scores than those who only attempted suicide once.

SABCS

The Suicidal Affect Behavior Cognition Scale (SABCS) is a six-item self-report measure based on both suicide and psychological theory, developed to assess current suicidality for clinical, screening, and research purposes. Substantial empirical evidence was found, from four independent studies, confirming the importance of assessing suicidal affect, behaviors, and cognition as a single suicidal construct. The SABCS was the first suicide risk measure to be developed through both classical test theory (CTT) and item response theory (IRT) psychometric approaches and to show significant improvements over a highly endorsed comparison measure. The SABCS was shown to have higher internal reliability, and to be a better predictor of both future suicidal behaviors and total suicidality over an existing standard.

Suicide Behaviors Questionnaire

The Suicide Behaviors Questionnaire (SBQ) is a self-report measure developed by Linehan in 1981. In 1988 it was transformed from a long questionnaire to a short four questions that can be completed in about 5 minutes. Answers are on a Likert scale that ranges in size for each question, based on data from the original questionnaire. It is designed for adults and results tend to correlate with other measures, such as the SSI. It is popular because it is easy to use as a screening tool, but at only four questions, fails to provide detailed information.

Life Orientation Inventory

The Life Orientation Inventory (LOI) is a self-report measure that comes in both a 30 question and 110 question form. Both forms use a 4-point Likert scale to answer items, which are divided into six sub-scales on the longer form: self-esteem vulnerability, over-investment, overdetermined misery, affective domination, alienation, and suicide tenability. This scale has strong reliability and validity, and has been shown to be able to differentiate between control, depressed, possibly suicidal, and highly suicidal individuals. It also contains 3 validity indices, similar to the MMPI. However, while useful, this inventory is now out of print.

Reasons For Living Inventory

The Reasons For Living Inventory (RFL) is theoretically based, and measures the probability of suicide based on the theory that some factors may mitigate suicidal thoughts. It was developed in 1983 by Linehan et al. and contains 48 items answered on a Likert scale from 1 to 6. The measure is divided into six subscales: survival and coping beliefs, responsibility to family, child concerns, fear of suicide, fear of social disproval, and moral objections. Scores are reported as an average for the total and each sub-scale. The scale is shown to be fairly reliable and valid, but is still mostly seen in research as compared to clinical use. Other variations of the scale include the College Students Reasons for Living Inventory, and the Brief Reasons for Living Inventory. The college students reasons for living inventory replaced the responsibility to family sub-scale with a responsibility to family and friends sub-scale and that replaced the child concerns sub-scale with a college/future concerns sub-scale. The Brief Reasons for Living Inventory uses only 12 of the items from the RFL.

Nurses Global Assessment of Suicide Risk

The Nurses Global Assessment of Suicide Risk (NGASR) was developed by Cutcliffe and Barker in 2004 to help novice practitioners with assessment of suicide risk, beyond the option of the current lengthy checklists currently available. It is based on 15 items, with some such as "Evidence of a plan to commit suicide" given a weighting of 3, while others, such as "History of psychosis" are weighted with a 1, giving a maximum total score of 25. Scores of 5 or less are considered low level of risk, 6-8 are intermediate level of risk, 9-11 are high level of risk, and 12 or more are very high level of risk. Each item is supported theoretically by studies that have shown a connection between the item and suicide. However, the validity and reliability of the test as a whole have not yet been empirically tested.

Demographic factors
Within the United States, the suicide rate is 11.3 suicides per 100,000 people within the general population.

Age
In the United States, the peak age for suicide is early adulthood, with a smaller peak of incidence in the elderly. On the other hand, there is no second peak in suicide in black men or women, and a much more muted and earlier-peaking rise in suicide amongst non-Hispanic women than their male counterparts. Older white males are the leading demographic group for suicide within the United States, at 47 deaths per 100,000 individuals for non-Hispanic white men over age 85. For Americans aged 65 and older, the rate is 14.3 per 100,000. Suicide rates are also elevated among teens.  For every 100,000 individuals within an age group there are 0.9 suicides in ages 10–14, 6.9 among ages 15–19, and 12.7 among ages 20–24.

Sex
China and São Tomé and Príncipe are the only countries in the world where suicide is more common among women than among men.

In the United States, suicide is around 4.5 times more common in men than in women. U.S. men are 5 times as likely to die from suicide within the 15- to 19-year-old demographic, and 6 times as likely as women to die from suicide within the 20- to 24-year-old demographic. Gelder, Mayou and Geddes reported that women are more likely to die from suicide by taking overdose of drugs than men.  Transgender individuals are at particularly high risk. Prolonged stress lasting 3 to 5 years, such clinical depression co-morbid with other conditions, can be a major factor in these cases.

Ethnicity and culture
In the United States white persons and Native Americans have the highest suicide rates, Black persons have intermediate rates, and Hispanic persons have the lowest rates of suicide. However, Native American males in the 15-24 age group have a dramatically higher suicide rate than any other group.
A similar pattern is seen in Australia, where Aboriginal people, especially young Aboriginal men, have a much higher rate of suicide than white Australians, a difference which is attributed to social marginalization, trans-generational trauma, and high rates of alcoholism. A link may be identified between depression and stress, and suicide.

Sexual orientation
There is evidence of elevated risk of suicide among non-heterosexual individuals (e.g. homosexual or bisexual individuals), especially among adolescents.

Biographical and historical factors
The literature on this subject consistently shows that a family history of suicide in first-degree relatives, adverse childhood experiences (parental loss and emotional, physical and sexual abuse), and adverse life situations (unemployment, isolation and acute psychosocial stressors) are associated with suicide risk.

Recent life events can act as precipitants. Significant interpersonal loss and family instability, such as bereavement, poor relationship with family, domestic partner violence, separation, and divorce have all been identified as risk factors. Financial stress, unemployment, and a drop in socioeconomic status can also be triggers for a suicidal crisis. This is also the case for a range of acute and chronic health problems, such as pain syndromes, or diagnoses of conditions like HIV or cancer.

Mental state
Certain clinical mental state features are predictive of suicide.  An affective state of hopelessness, in other words a sense that nothing will ever get better, is a powerful predictive feature. High risk is also associated with a state of severe anger and hostility, or with agitation, anxiety, fearfulness, or apprehension. Research domain criteria symptom burdens, particularly the positive and negative valence domains, are associated with time varying risk of suicide.  Specific psychotic symptoms, such as grandiose delusions, delusions of thought insertion and mind reading are thought to indicate a higher likelihood of suicidal behavior. Command hallucinations are often considered indicative of suicide risk, but the empirical evidence for this is equivocal. Another psychiatric illness that is a high risk of suicide is schizophrenia.  The risk is particularly higher in younger patients who have insight into the serious effect the illness is likely to have on their lives.

The primary and necessary mental state Federico Sanchez called idiozimia (from idios "self" and zimia "loss"), followed by suicidal thoughts, hopelessness, loss of will power, hippocampal damage due to stress hormones, and finally either the activation of a suicidal belief system, or in the case of panic or anxiety attacks the switching over to an anger attack, are the converging reasons for a suicide to occur.

Suicidal ideation

Suicidal ideation refers to the thoughts that a person has about suicide. Assessment of suicidal ideation includes assessment of the extent of preoccupation with thoughts of suicide (for example continuous or specific thoughts), specific plans, and the person's reasons and motivation to attempt suicide.

Planning
Assessment of suicide risk includes an assessment of the degree of planning, the potential or perceived lethality of the suicide method that the person is considering, and whether the person has access to the means to carry out these plans (such as access to a firearm). A suicide plan may include the following elements: timing, availability of method, setting, and actions made towards carrying out the plan (such as obtaining medicines, poisons, rope or a weapon), choosing and inspecting a setting, and rehearsing the plan. The more detailed and specific the suicide plan, the greater the level of risk. The presence of a suicide note generally suggests more premeditation and greater suicidal intent. The assessment would always include an exploration of the timing and content of any suicide note and a discussion of its meaning with the person who wrote it.

Motivation to die
Suicide risk assessment includes an assessment of the person's reasons for wanting to die from suicide. Some are due to overwhelming emotions or others can have a deep philosophical belief. The causes are highly varied.

Other motivations for suicide
Suicide is not motivated only by a wish to die. Other motivations for suicide include being motivated to end the suffering psychologically and a person suffering from a terminal illness may intend to die from suicide as a means of managing physical pain and/or their way of dealing with possible future atrophy or death.

Reasons to live
Balanced against reasons to die are the suicidal person's reasons to live, and an assessment would include an enquiry into the person's reasons for living and plans for the future.

Past suicidal acts
There are people who die from suicide the first time they have suicidal thoughts and there are many who have suicidal thoughts and never attempt or die from suicide.

Suicide risk and mental illness
All major mental disorders carry an increased risk of suicide. However, 90% of suicides can be traced to depression, linked either to manic-depression (bipolar), major depression (unipolar), schizophrenia or personality disorders, particularly borderline personality disorder. Comorbity of mental disorders increases suicide risk, especially anxiety or panic attacks.

Anorexia nervosa has a particularly strong association with suicide: the rate of suicide is forty times greater than the general population. The lifetime risk of suicide was 18% in one study, and in another study 27% of all deaths related to anorexia nervosa were due to suicide.

The long-term suicide rate for people with schizophrenia was estimated to be between 10 and 22% based upon longitudinal studies that extrapolated 10 years of illness for lifetime, but a more recent meta-analysis has estimated that 4.9% of people with schizophrenia will die from suicide during their lifetimes, usually near the illness onset.  
Risk factors for suicide among people with schizophrenia include a history of previous suicide attempts, the degree of illness severity, comorbid depression or post-psychotic depression, social isolation, and male gender. The risk is higher for the paranoid subtype of schizophrenia, and is highest in the time immediately after discharge from hospital.

While the lifetime suicide risk for mood disorders in general is around 1%, long-term follow-up studies of people who have been hospitalized for severe depression show a suicide risk of up to 13%. People with severe depression are 20 times more likely and people with bipolar disorder are 15 times more likely to die from suicide than members of the general population.
Depressed people with agitation, severe insomnia, anxiety symptoms, and co-morbid anxiety disorders are particularly at-risk. Antidepressants have been linked with suicide as Healy (2009) stated that people on antidepressant have the tendency to die from suicide after 10–14 days of commencement of antidepressant.

People with a diagnosis of a personality disorder, particularly borderline, antisocial or narcissistic personality disorders, are at a high risk of suicide. In this group, elevated suicide risk is associated with younger age, comorbid drug addiction and major mood disorders, a history of childhood sexual abuse, impulsive and antisocial personality traits, and recent reduction of psychiatric care, such as recent discharge from hospital. While some people with personality disorders may make manipulative or contingent suicide threats, the threat is likely to be non-contingent when the person is silent, passive, withdrawn, hopeless, and making few demands.

A history of excessive alcohol use is common among people who die from suicide, and alcohol intoxication at the time of the suicide attempt is a common pattern. Meta analytic research conducted in 2015 indicates that a person with co-occurring alcohol use disorder and major depression is more likely to ideate, attempt, and complete suicide than those with individual disorders.

Theoretical models

See also 

 Gender differences in suicide
 LGBT Mormon suicides
 List of LGBT-related suicides
 Mental health first aid
 Mental health
 Mental status examination (MSE)
 Suicide among LGBT youth
 Suicide awareness
 Suicide crisis
 Suicide intervention
 Suicide prevention
 Suicide terminology

Notes

References

Further reading 

 By comparing this text with earlier editions, unchanging fundamentals can be identified.

 
 

Mental disorders screening and assessment tools
Suicide prevention
Treatment of bipolar disorder